Tanner John Groves (born May 22, 1999) is an American college basketball player for the Oklahoma Sooners of the Big 12 Conference. He previously played for the Eastern Washington Eagles.

Early life and high school career
Groves was born and grew up in Spokane, Washington and attended Shadle Park High School. He was named All-State and All-Greater Spokane League as a senior after averaging 18.2 points, 9.5 rebounds, and 1.8 blocks per game.

College career
Groves redshirted his true freshman season. He played mostly off the bench as a redshirt freshman and sophomore before becoming a starter as a redshirt junior. He was named the Big Sky Conference Player of the Year in 2021. Groves averaged 17.2 points and eight rebounds per game. On April 18, 2021, he transferred to Oklahoma.

Career statistics

College

|-
| style="text-align:left;"| 2017–18
| style="text-align:left;"| Eastern Washington
| style="text-align:center;" colspan="11"|  Redshirt
|-
| style="text-align:left;"| 2018–19
| style="text-align:left;"| Eastern Washington
| 28 || 2 || 8.6 || .417 || .385 || .650 || 2.1 || .3 || .1 || .6 || 2.8
|-
| style="text-align:left;"| 2019–20
| style="text-align:left;"| Eastern Washington
| 30 || 1 || 9.9 || .589 || .424 || .636 || 2.8 || .3 || .1 || .6 || 5.1
|-
| style="text-align:left;"| 2020–21
| style="text-align:left;"| Eastern Washington
| 24 || 24 || 27.0 || .560 || .349 || .778 || 8.0 || 1.3 || .3 || 1.1 || 17.2
|-
| style="text-align:left;"| 2021–22
| style="text-align:left;"| Oklahoma
| 34 || 34 || 25.0 || .532 || .381 || .729 || 5.8 || 1.6 || .4 || .4 || 11.6
|-
| style="text-align:left;"| 2022–23
| style="text-align:left;"| Oklahoma
| 32 || 32 || 25.4 || .508 || .286 || .724 || 7.2 || 1.4 || .8 || 1.1 || 10.2
|- class="sortbottom"
| style="text-align:center;" colspan="2"| Career
| 148 || 93 || 19.3 || .532 || .353 || .733 || 5.1 || 1.0 || .3 || .7 || 9.2

References

External links
Oklahoma Sooners bio
Eastern Washington Eagles bio

1999 births
Living people
American men's basketball players
Basketball players from Spokane, Washington
Centers (basketball)
Eastern Washington Eagles men's basketball players
Oklahoma Sooners men's basketball players
Power forwards (basketball)